The Rila motorway, still undesignated, is a planned motorway in southern Bulgaria.

It will start from the Gyueshevo border crossing with North Macedonia and end with connection to the Trakia motorway (A1) near Ihtiman. 
It will pass near the cities of Kyustendil, Dupnitsa (Struma motorway (A3)) and Samokov. 

The motorway will duplicate the national road I-6 to Kyustendil and II-62 to Samokov and along it will pass the European road E871 to Kyustendil. It will be a part of the  Pan-European Transport Corridor 8.

The total planned length of the Rila motorway is about 170 km, with 0 km completed as of 2022.

Name 
The motorway is named after the Rila mountain which is nearby the main route.

Exits

References

Motorways in Bulgaria
Proposed roads in Bulgaria